The Love Special is a surviving 1921 American silent drama film directed by Frank Urson and written by Eugene B. Lewis and Frank H. Spearman. The film stars Wallace Reid, Agnes Ayres, Theodore Roberts, Lloyd Whitlock, Sylvia Ashton, and William Gaden. The film was released on March 20, 1921, by Paramount Pictures.

Cast 
Wallace Reid as Jim Glover
Agnes Ayres as Laura Gage
Theodore Roberts as President Gage
Lloyd Whitlock as Allen Harrison
Sylvia Ashton as Mrs. Whitney
William Gaden as William Bucks
Clarence Burton as Morris Blood
Snitz Edwards as Zeka Logan
Ernest Butterworth as 'Gloomy'
Zelma Maja as Stenographer

Preservation status
The Love Special is preserved at the Library of Congress and UCLA Film & Television Archive.

See also
Wallace Reid filmography

References

External links

Film stills at silenthollywood.com

1921 films
1920s English-language films
Silent American drama films
1921 drama films
Paramount Pictures films
American black-and-white films
American silent feature films
Films directed by Frank Urson
1920s American films